Gavin Coles (born 19 October 1968) is an Australian professional golfer.

Coles is currently a member of the Nationwide Tour, where he has won 5 events; including 2 co-sanctioned events with the PGA Tour of Australasia. He was a member of the Nationwide Tour in 2002, 2004 and 2006 and the PGA Tour in 2003, 2005 and 2007.

Professional wins (5)

PGA Tour of Australasia wins (2)

1Co-sanctioned by the Nationwide Tour

PGA Tour of Australasia playoff record (0–1)

Nationwide Tour wins (5)

1Co-sanctioned by the PGA Tour of Australasia

Nationwide Tour playoff record (0–1)

Results in World Golf Championships

See also
2002 Buy.com Tour graduates
2004 Nationwide Tour graduates
2006 Nationwide Tour graduates
2011 Nationwide Tour graduates
List of golfers with most Web.com Tour wins

External links

Australian male golfers
PGA Tour of Australasia golfers
PGA Tour golfers
Korn Ferry Tour graduates
Sportsmen from New South Wales
People from the Central Tablelands
1968 births
Living people